William Y. Baker was a member of the Wisconsin State Assembly during the 1878 session. Other positions he held include Chairman (similar to Mayor), Postmaster and Clerk of Oakdale (town), Wisconsin, along with County Commissioner (similar to Supervisor) of Monroe County, Wisconsin. He was a Republican. Baker was born on September 7, 1829.

References

People from Monroe County, Wisconsin
Republican Party members of the Wisconsin State Assembly
Mayors of places in Wisconsin
Wisconsin postmasters
City and town clerks
County supervisors in Wisconsin
1829 births
Year of death missing